The 2016 Sun Belt women's basketball tournament was the postseason women's basketball tournament for the Sun Belt Conference beginning on March 9, 2016, and ending on March 12, 2016 in New Orleans, Louisiana at the Lakefront Arena.

Seeds

Schedule

Bracket

References

External links
 2016 Sun Belt Women's Basketball Championship

2015–16 NCAA Division I women's basketball season
Sun Belt Conference women's basketball tournament
2015–16 Sun Belt Conference women's basketball season
Sun Belt Conference Women's B